Izvoarele Sucevei (Izvory) is a commune located in Suceava County, Bukovina, northeastern Romania. It is composed of three villages: namely Bobeica, Brodina (also called Brodina de Sus), and Izvoarele Sucevei.

The commune is located in the northwestern part of the county, on the border with Chernivtsi Oblast, Ukraine. The Suceava River arises from the nearby Obcina Mestecăniș Mountains, and flows south to north through the commune. The river Brodina flows though the village of Brodina de Sus,  discharging into the Suceava in the nearby Brodina commune.

At the 2011 census, 54.7% of inhabitants were Ukrainians and 45.2% Romanians. At the 2002 census, 73.9% were Eastern Orthodox, 23.2% stated they belonged to another religion, and 2.7% were Seventh-day Adventist.

Administration and local politics

Commune council 

The commune's current local council has the following political composition, according to the results of the 2020 Romanian local elections:

Natives 

 Vasile Hutopilă

References 

Communes in Suceava County
Localities in Southern Bukovina
Ukrainian communities in Romania